The Oakland Park Elementary School is a historic school in Oakland Park, Florida, United States. The school, part of Broward County Public Schools, is located at 936 Northeast 33rd Street. On June 9, 1988, it was added to the U.S. National Register of Historic Places.  the principle of the school is Michelle Garcia. The mascot of the school is an eagle. Grades are Pre-K, K, 1st, 2nd, 3rd, 4th, and 5th. There are English for Speakers of Other Languages students in this school who typically natively speak Spanish or Creole.

History
The school was built in 1926 before the city was incorporated as Oakland Park (1929) when it was Floranada. Local residents sheltered in the school during hurricanes. It was expanded in 1949 with the addition of three rooms. It is the oldest Broward County school in continuous use. In 1951 the school had 275 students. In 1988 enrollment was 458.

Layout
The main classroom building, built in 1926 is U-shaped and has arcaded walkways and an open courtyard. The vaulted rectangular two story auditorium was built in 1927.

References

External links

Schools in Broward County, Florida
Public elementary schools in Florida
National Register of Historic Places in Broward County, Florida
Broward County Public Schools
1926 establishments in Florida
Educational institutions established in 1926